The 1977–78 season was Nottingham Forest's first year back in the First Division since their relegation in 1972. They had finished third in the Second Division the previous season to earn promotion.

Summary

Forest's credentials at the start of the season did not appear to be especially impressive. Promotion from Division Two in 1976–77 had been achieved only by the skin of their teeth and the squad of players was a mixture of underachievers, journeymen and inexperienced youngsters. Many pundits tipped them to struggle. However, Brian Clough and Peter Taylor had already proved at Derby County that they were capable of blending a winning formula from apparently limited resources and they would now do so again. No player epitomised Forest's success more than Kenny Burns, who arrived for £150,000 in pre-season from Birmingham City where he had acquired something of a 'wild man' reputation. Having spent several years playing as a forward, Burns was converted back to the defensive role where he had begun his career and although it took a few matches for him to settle he ended the season by being voted Footballer of the Year.

Forest confounded the critics from the outset, registering three straight league wins to top the first table of the season and thrashing West Ham United 5–0 in the second round of the League Cup. Although their 100% record ended with a 3–0 defeat at Arsenal, Forest won the next three and ended September second in the table behind Manchester City on goal difference. A 4–0 win over Ipswich Town at the beginning of October (Peter Withe scoring all four) restored them to the top of the table and there they stayed for the rest of the season. After a slight hiccup in November saw them lose consecutive away matches at Chelsea and Leeds United they went unbeaten in their remaining 26 league fixtures and were confirmed as champions following a goalless draw at Coventry City in April.

Two further additions had been made to the playing squad in the early weeks of the season. Peter Shilton was signed from Stoke City for £325,000, then a record transfer fee for a goalkeeper, and Archie Gemmill joined from Derby in a deal that also saw Shilton's predecessor John Middleton move in the opposite direction. Middleton had conceded six goals in Forest's opening five league matches - Shilton would concede only 18 in the remaining 37. In December, Forest bought David Needham from Queens Park Rangers for £140,000 to add depth to the defence. Nevertheless, they used just 17 players during the season, one of whom (teenage reserve goalkeeper Chris Woods) only appeared in the League Cup as cover for the cup-tied Shilton.

Forest's League Cup run saw them score 23 goals in just six matches en route to facing Liverpool in the final at Wembley where Woods performed heroics to keep the reigning league and European champions at bay and earn Forest a goalless draw. Liverpool also had the better of the replay at Old Trafford but a controversial penalty converted by John Robertson was enough to give Forest their first piece of major silverware since the FA Cup in 1959. A clean sweep of domestic trophies looked a distinct possibility until defeat at West Bromwich Albion in the FA Cup quarter-final.

Players

Squad Stats

The statistics for the following players are for their time during 1977–78 season playing for Nottingham Forest. Any stats from a different club during 1977-78 are not included. Includes all competitive matches.

Transfers In

Transfers Out

Club Kit

|
|

Table

Results by round

Matches

A list of Nottingham Forest's matches in the 1977–78 season.

Competitive

Division One

League Cup

Second round

Third round

Fourth round

Fifth round

Semifinals

Final

Replay

FA Cup

Third round

Fourth round

Fifth round

Replay

Second replay

Sixth round

Pre-season and Friendlies

References

Nottingham Forest F.C. seasons
Nottingham Forest F.C.
English football championship-winning seasons